The 2014–15 Texas A&M Aggies men's basketball team represented Texas A&M University in the 2014–15 NCAA Division I men's basketball season. The team's head coach was Billy Kennedy, who was in his fourth season. The team played their home games at the Reed Arena in College Station, Texas and played in its third season as a member of the Southeastern Conference. They finished the season 21–12, 11–7 in SEC play to finish in a four-way tie for third place. They lost in the second round of the SEC tournament to Auburn. They were invited to the National Invitation Tournament where they defeated Montana in the first round before losing in the second round to Louisiana Tech. The Texas A&M men's basketball team and support staff were the recipients of the men's SEC Sportsmanship Award.

Before the season

Departures

Incoming Transfers

Recruits

Recruits for class of 2015

Roster

Schedule and results

|-
!colspan=12 style="background:#500000; color:#FFFFFF;"| Exhibition

|-
!colspan=12 style="background:#500000; color:#FFFFFF;"| Non-conference games

|-
!colspan=12 style="background:#500000; color:#FFFFFF;"| Conference games

|-
!colspan=12 style="background:#500000;"| SEC tournament

|-
!colspan=12 style="background:#500000;"| NIT

References

Texas A&M Aggies men's basketball seasons
Texas AandM
Texas AandM